Anna State Hospital, contemporarily known as Choate Mental Health and Developmental Center, is a public psychiatric hospital in Anna, Illinois, established in 1869. The original hospital was constructed under the Kirkbride Plan.

Choate has been accused of patient abuse and neglect since the late 1990s, and faced scrutiny by local media and public officials in 2022 following detailed accounts of violence against patients and lying to state investigators.

References

Further reading

1869 establishments in Illinois
Hospitals in Illinois
Kirkbride Plan hospitals
Psychiatric hospitals in Illinois